PageSpinner is a semi-WYSIWYG HTML editor for OS X. It is developed by Optima Systems and released as shareware, PageSpinner is WorldScript compliant and uses the WASTE text engine and the Carbon library. It was originally released for Classic Mac OS but was ported to OS X shortly after that operating system's release. It was used by Jeffrey Zeldman for 13 years before he switched to TextMate.

Version 4.0, released in 2002, introduced multiple undo, double-byte input support, and scroll wheel support on Mac OS X. Version 4.6.3 was deemed "quirky and erratic" in 2006 by the reviewer for About This Particular Macintosh.

Version 5 was released in 2010 and reviewed by MacWorld UK, which faulted its appearance for being dated, and found its price to be high for the features it provided, but the reviewer was impressed with its multiple site support and integration with Apache, OS X's standard web server.

As of June 2019, the Optima Systems website is offline and the current status of PageSpinner is unknown.

As of February 2020 the Optima Systems website links to an unwanted site not safe for office viewing.

External links
Optima website does not exist
1997 Tidbits review of version 2.0.1
Edit Tag Appearance - change how PageSpinner inserts HTML tags

References

HTML editors
MacOS Internet software